Puthucurichy (spelled also Puthencurichy/Puthukurichy) is a town on the coast of Kerala, India.  This residential area situated between Mariyanad and Perumathura on Veli – Perumathura road. Main landmarks are St. Michael's Church, Muhayyideen Juma Masjid, Puthucurichy Government Hospital, State Bank of Travancore, Telephone Exchange, Post Office, Our Lady Of Mercy Higher secondary school, Govt. L.P School etc. The nearest Airport is Trivandrum International Airport and Murukkumpuzha Railway Station is the nearest Railway Station.

References

Villages in Thiruvananthapuram district